Ollie Lindsay-Hague (born 8 October 1990) is a professional rugby union player, who played for Harlequin F.C.

Lindsay-Hague is a versatile member of the squad having played wing, fullback and also scrum-half for the club.

He was educated at Hall School Wimbledon and Millfield School where he was Sevens captain. He first played pro rugby at London Welsh, while also representing the England Under 16 A team as well as playing for England in 7s.

Lindsay-Hague was selected to represent Great Britain at the 2016 Summer Olympics in Rugby sevens. It was announced in August 2016 that he was leaving Harlequins.

In August 2021, it was announced that Lindsay-Hague would join Newcastle Falcons and return to the 15-a-side format.

References

External links
 
 
 
 
 
 

1990 births
Living people
English rugby union players
Rugby union players from London
Harlequin F.C. players
People educated at Millfield
Rugby sevens players at the 2016 Summer Olympics
Olympic rugby sevens players of Great Britain
Great Britain national rugby sevens team players
Olympic silver medallists for Great Britain
Olympic medalists in rugby sevens
Medalists at the 2016 Summer Olympics
English rugby sevens players
Male rugby sevens players
Commonwealth Games medallists in rugby sevens
Commonwealth Games bronze medallists for England
Rugby sevens players at the 2018 Commonwealth Games
Rugby sevens players at the 2020 Summer Olympics
Medallists at the 2018 Commonwealth Games